An air fryer is a small countertop convection oven designed to simulate deep frying without submerging the food in oil. A fan circulates hot air at a high speed, producing a crisp layer via browning reactions such as the Maillard reaction. Some product reviewers find that regular convection ovens or convection toaster ovens produce better results, or say that air frying is essentially the same as convection baking. It can reheat previously cooked foods and frozen foods.

Cooking

Air fryers circulate hot air to cook food that would otherwise be submerged in oil. The air fryer's cooking chamber radiates heat from a heating element near the food, and a fan circulates hot air.

The original Philips Airfryer used radiant heat from a heating element just above the food and convection heat from a strong air stream flowing upwards through the open bottom of the food chamber, delivering heat from all sides, with a small volume of hot air forced to pass from the heater surface and over the food, with no idle air circulating as in a convection oven. A shaped guide directed the airflow over the bottom of the food. The technique was patented as Rapid Air technology.

Most air fryers have temperature and timer adjustments that allow more precise cooking. Food is typically cooked in a basket that sits on a drip tray. The basket must be periodically agitated, either manually or by the fryer mechanism. Convection ovens and air fryers are similar in the way they cook food, but air fryers are generally smaller and give off less heat.

History

Convection ovens have been in wide use since 1945.

In 2010, Philips introduced the Airfryer brand of convection oven at a consumer electronics fair in Berlin. By 2018, the term "airfryer" was starting to be used generically.

See also
 List of cooking appliances

References

Further reading

 
 

21st-century inventions
cooking appliances
fried foods